Cremorne railway station was an inner suburban station in Melbourne, Australia. It was on the Melbourne and Suburban Railway Company’s line from Princes Bridge station to Windsor station, and was located just north of Balmain Street on the Melbourne side of the Yarra River bridge, in a part of the suburb of Richmond which is now known as Cremorne.

The line was opened as far as Cremorne station in December 1859. One of the station's main functions was to encourage visitors to Melbourne's Cremorne Gardens. George Coppin, who was the proprietor of the attraction, lobbied the Melbourne and Suburban Railway Company, and then entered a financial arrangement with it, to expedite the building of the quarter-mile, four-minute extension from Richmond railway station. Often the price of admission to the gardens included free return rail ticket from the city to Cremorne station. Trains continued to stop at the station after the railway bridge over the Yarra from Cremorne to South Yarra was completed a year later.

The Cremorne Gardens closed in early 1863, and the last known train to stop at Cremorne station was on 23 November 1863, the day of the auction to dispose of the goods that remained in the Gardens. In 1890, Richmond residents lobbied the Victorian Railways Commissioners to reopen the station, but their request was refused as the station was deemed 'unnecessary'. There are no remains of the station and subsequent track expansion now covers the area where it once stood.

References

Disused railway stations in Melbourne
Railway stations in Australia opened in 1859
Railway stations closed in 1860